Morton is a neighborhood in Northwest Philadelphia.  It is located south of West Oak Lane, east of Mount Airy, and west of North Broad Street.

The Robert Fulton School, Mennonite Meetinghouse, and Theodore Roosevelt Junior High School are listed on the National Register of Historic Places.

References 

Neighborhoods in Philadelphia
Northwest Philadelphia